The Long Kin East Cave - Rift Pot system is a limestone cave system on the southern flanks of Ingleborough, North Yorkshire in England lying within the designated Ingleborough Site of Special Scientific Interest. At the bottom, the stream flows through some low canals and sumps, to eventually emerge at Austwick Beck Head in Crummackdale.

Description
The main entrance to Long Kin East Cave is where a small stream sinks into a deepening fissure in a small exposure of limestone rocks located in an extensive area of moorland. The fissure gains a roof and morphs into a walking-sized meandering stream passage, passing an alternative dry entrance at the first corner. After  the passage passes below a walled-off pothole where daylight enters.

A route through the boulders at the bottom of the Long Kin East entrance drops into the continuation of the stream passage. This continues for a further  where it starts to descend a succession of small cascades and pitches. Upstream ascends a boulder slope where various routes from Rift Pot enter. Downstream, a mud slope drops into a stream passage, which continues upstream as a series of oxbows that reappear in the chamber. The stream continues low and wide to a junction. Upstream from the junction, a wet crawl reaches some gour pools in a walking-sized passage, before continuing as a crawl which chokes just to the east of Jockey Hole.

A few metres back from the chamber overlooking the main pitch, a bedding traverse in the roof of the passage leads to a high chamber overlooking the shaft. A boulder slope can be followed round the chamber to a rock bridge crossing the rift. A short descent from The Bridge leads into Rift Pot (see below).

The Rift Pot entrance is located on the same major fault as is seen underground. The entrance shaft drops  into a large chamber. The chamber is blind to the north, but an ascent of boulders on the south side climbs up into one end of the enormous fault chamber, at the far end of which enters Long Kin East Cave. Two small pitches over boulders lead to a boulder platform below The Bridge, from the top of which a traverse leads back into Long Kin East Cave.

Both Rift Pot and Long Kin East Cave have been equipped with resin P-hangers allowing cavers to follow a number of different routes to the bottom using single rope techniques.

Geology and hydrology

The Long Kin East system is a solutional cave formed in Visean Great Scar limestone from the Mississippian Series of the Carboniferous period. The entrance passage is a meandering vadose canyon which descends gradually following the local southerly dip before reaching the main shaft. This, and Rift Pot, are formed in the breccia and shear zone of a major fault.

History
There is a mention of Long Kin in an article published in The Gentleman's Magazine, by Pastor, know to be a pseudonym for John Hutton, in March 1761, but despite associating it with the near-by Jockey Hole the description matches neither Rift Pot nor Long East Cave: "There is, likewise, partly south-east, a small rivulet which falls into a place considerable deep, called Long-Kin;". It is clear that the first part of Long Kin East Cave had been explored as far as the skylight entrances by 1889, as a paper published in the Leeds Geological Association Transactions says: "these being three fissures connected by a subterranean passage, through which a small stream flows". A detailed description of the cave was given by Balderstone in Ingleton: Bygone and Present, published in 1890, but it seems that he did not reach as far as the two skylight entries. He also describes two surface shafts he called "Long Kin Holes". The hydrological connection between Long Kin East Cave and Austwick Beck Head was established in 1900 using fluorescein by the Yorkshire Geological Society.

Rift Pot was first descended in 1904 by members of the Yorkshire Ramblers Club. The full descent was made over three separate days, with the party being hampered by a large quantity of loose rock. They named the pothole, Rift Pot, "because of its characteristic form, it being literally a huge vertical rift in the limestone". In 1904 a party the Yorkshire Speleological Association (YSA) including Eli Simpson, dug through the boulders at the bottom  of what is now known as Long Kin East Pot, to reach the continuation of the Long Kin East Cave streamway. Two more explorations took place in 1904 and 1905, but it is unclear how far was reached. In 1906 the  followed the stream through to the head of the  shaft which drops in the final chamber of Rift Pot. They also discovered the traverse over the head of the big pitch leading to the top of The Bridge in Rift Pot from where they could discern daylight filtering through from ahead. The connection between the two caves was made in 1908 when a  group who had descended Long Kin East Cave hung a ladder from the bridge and joined a party who had descended Rift Pot. The first descent of the big pitch in Long Kin East was made in 1925 by members of the Gritstone Club, when they also produced a survey of the relationship between the two caves. The first mention of the upstream passages was in October 1969 when University of Leeds Speleological Association reported that they had surveyed them in 1967. The 68 Series were explored in 1968 by members of the same club.

The terminal sump was first dived by Dave Yeandle in 1975, but little progress was made in the low visibility. Rick Stanton had three dives in 1987, to reach the current limit without reaching a positive conclusion.

References

External links
Online surveys of the Long Kin East Cave - Rift Pot system
Rigging guide for Long Kin Cave
Rigging guide for Rift Pot

Caves of North Yorkshire
Limestone caves